The Penn State–West Virginia football rivalry is an American college football rivalry between the Penn State Nittany Lions and West Virginia Mountaineers. Penn State leads the series 48–9–2.

Penn State and West Virginia have met 59 times, the third-highest number of meetings for a Nittany Lion opponent, trailing only Pitt (100) and Syracuse (71). The Nittany Lions and Mountaineers first met in 1904 and played every season from 1947 to 1992 (46 games), with the series ending in 1993 after Penn State and West Virginia joined the Big Ten and Big East Conferences, respectively.

Series history
In 1904, 1905, 1906, 1908, and 1909, West Virginia went to State College to face Penn State. They were shut out each time. They met again at Yankee Stadium in 1923. The result was a 13–13 tie. 

In 1925, the first game in Morgantown took place. It was also West Virginia's first win, 14–0. The next game was also played at Morgantown in 1931, resulting in another Mountaineer victory. The next game was played at Penn State in 1940, a Nittany Lion victory. In 1941, the Lions won again 7–0. 

In 1942, West Virginia won at home 24–0. Penn State won in 1943 32–7, but West Virginia won 28–27 at home in 1944. Penn State won the next six.

In 1953 and 1954, West Virginia upset Penn State at New Beaver Field 20–19 and 19–14. In 1955 West Virginia won at home 21–7. From 1956–83, Penn State went 27–0–1. They had consecutive victories over some of West Virginia's greatest quarterbacks, such as Oliver Luck and Penn State-transfer Jeff Hostetler. Joe Paterno also became coach of Penn State in 1967, while Don Nehlen became West Virginia's coach in 1980.

In 1984, West Virginia won for the first time since 1955 in Morgantown, with a 17–14 upset. However, Penn State won the next three. In 1988, under Major Harris' lead, West Virginia won 51–30, en route to an undefeated regular season, making them the only team to score more than 50 points on any Joe Paterno coached Penn State squad. Penn State followed up by winning the last four.

The schools announced on September 19, 2013, that they would renew the series with two games in 2023 and 2024, one each in State College and Morgantown.

Game results

See also 
 List of NCAA college football rivalry games

References

College football rivalries in the United States
Penn State Nittany Lions football
West Virginia Mountaineers football
1904 establishments in Pennsylvania